The Oakland Six was the first six-cylinder engine offered by the Oakland Motor Company in 1913 which became a division of General Motors in 1909. The Oakland Six was offered in many different model names that changed every year, along with several body styles and engine displacements until 1929, when the V8 was reintroduced, then in 1931 Oakland was renamed Pontiac. When Oakland became a division of GM and introduced the Oakland Four, Oldsmobile and Buick shared bodywork and chassis of their six-cylinder models with Oakland. When Chevrolet became part of GM in 1917, Oakland chassis and bodywork were shared with Chevrolet. Manufacture of the Oakland was completed in Pontiac, Michigan.

History
The 1913 Greyhound was developed and manufactured after GM bought Oakland Motor Company and the engine was provided by Northway Motor and Manufacturing Division of GM and was positioned above the Oakland Four.

For 1914 the Model 6-60 and 6-48 were both introduced using the previous wheelbase but two different horsepower ratings. The more powerful 6-60 was available with four body styles but one listed price of US$2,450 ($ in  dollars ) while the 6-48 had three types including a speedster listed at US$1,785 ($ in  dollars ).

Model year 1915 saw further refinement with only two body styles offered and two wheelbases of 110" and 123.5"; the 1915 was labeled as the Model 49 while the 1916 was labeled the Model 32. Mechanical and appearance changes occurred as usual from GM products during this time, and total production for 1915 was recorded at 12,000 cars.

1917 was the end of WWI and the Six Model 34 was now the entry-level product when the Model 50 V8 was introduced. Prices had significantly dropped and four body styles were offered for the Six; a roadster, touring sedan and closed body coupe were offered on a 112" wheelbase for US$945 ($ in  dollars ) while the sedan was slightly more at US$1,020 ($ in  dollars ). The Chevrolet Series 490 and Chevrolet Series F were now part of GM and took the entry-level position in the corporate hierarchy.

Unusually, the Oakland Model 50 V8 didn't return for 1918 and the Model 34-B continued for 1919 and was the only product offered for Oakland in six different body styles and prices ranged from US$1,050 ($ in  dollars ) to US$1,550 ($ in  dollars ) for the closed body coupe or sedan. Model years 1920 continued with the 112" wheelbase while 1921 and 1922 used a 115" wheelbase while all models were identified as the 34-C, with only minor changes to technology, appearance and body styles offered. Prices ranged from US$1,395 ($ in  dollars ) to US$2,065 ($ in  dollars ).

1923 was a pivotal year as prices dropped to US$975 ($ in  dollars ) for a roadster or touring sedan to US$1,545 ($ in  dollars ) for a closed body sedan. Minor mechanical, appearance changes continued while the naming convention changed to Model 6-44 with a 115" wheelbase. Roadsters and touring sedans had the ability to fold the windshield forward on top of the cowl for open air driving.

1924 and 1925 were the last years of the Oakland Model 6-54 using a 113" wheelbase before Pontiac was introduced and ten different body styles were now provided by new GM Division Fisher Body with both open and closed coachwork choices available. The most affordable choice was the US$1,095 ($ in  dollars ) five-passenger touring sedan to the US$1,645 ($ in  dollars ) Landau Sedan.

More changes in appearance, chassis length and body styles, and the 1926 and 1927 were called the Greater Six with a 113" wheelbase, then in 1928 it was again changed to the Model 212 All-American with a 117" wheelbase. 1929 was the last year the All-American Six was offered while offering eight different body styles.

References

See also
Cadillac Type 51
LaSalle Series 303
Buick Six
Oldsmobile Six
Chevrolet Series FA

Vintage vehicles
1920s cars